Yury Vasyutsin (born 20 July 1978) is a retired Belarusian professional footballer. He spent his almost entire career at FC Vitebsk, excluding a short spell in a then-farm club Lokomotiv Vitebsk.

In July 2010, Vasyutsin came in as a substitute outfield player in a cup game against Khimik Svetlogorsk and scored a winning goal in extra time.

References

External links

1978 births
Living people
Belarusian footballers
Association football goalkeepers
FC Vitebsk players
FC Lokomotiv Vitebsk (defunct) players
People from Orsha
Sportspeople from Vitebsk Region